Rinat Shakirov (born 1962) was a He was born in Karaganda (Kazakhstan).

Education 
Graduated from the Physics & Mathematics School in 1979 and entered the Leningrad Polytechnic Institute (Department of Nuclear Physics). Dabbled in music.

Rinat Shakirov decided to become a musician in 1981. He studied at the music school with the famous piano teacher Alfred Rippe (working in Marburg, Germany). 

He repeatedly won regional piano competitions during his studies. (Alma-Ata, Frunze). 

He continued his studies at the St. Petersburg Conservatory with Stanislav Igolinsky and Moscow Conservatory with Lev Vlasenko from 1985 to 1992.

In 1994 he took part in the Xth International Competition after P.I. Tchaikovsky, Moscow (I, II rounds).

Career 
On graduating from the conservatory, he was engaged in the concert and teaching activities. His concert programs performed based on Bach, Schubert, Rachmaninov, Tchaikovsky, Chopin, Debussy, Ravel, Gershwin ... works have been widely recognized by the public and critics.  The music of contemporary composers - Messiaen, Stravinsky, Hindemith, Ligeti, Satie, Bartok, Copland takes a significant part in Rinat Shakirov repertoire, as well as the music of Tatarstan composers - Yarullin, Yakhin, Kalimullin, Monasypov, Enikeev and others.

Author of the piano suite based on F.Yarullin's Shurale ballet, published in Moscow in 2005 and 2011 in the Composer Publishing House.

Recorded nine discs and records of piano classics in the studios in Russia, Tatarstan and Kazakhstan.

Since 1990 he has performed more than 600 solo concerts in Russia, Italy, Finland, France, Germany, Sweden, Belgium, Switzerland. He performed in the halls of Moscow, St. Petersburg, Kazan, Voronezh, Orel, Astana, Almaty, Milan, Paris, Stockholm, Helsinki, Zurich, Basel, Kassel, Stuttgart, Brussels, etc. 

Rinat Shakirov works with many orchestras and conductors, including Fuat Mansurov, Ravil Martynov, Alexander Kantorov, Mikhail Sinkevich, Dmitry Khokhlov, Andrei Anikhanov, Fabio Mastrangelo, Sergei Stadler, Alexander Sladkovsky, Igor Manasherov and Rustem Abyazov.

Shakirov took part in the international music festivals such as Geteborg Art Sound, Europe-Asia, St. Petersburg Musical Spring, Other Space, Japanese Spring in St. Petersburg, Panorama of Russian Music, Moscow Autumn, Names of St. Petersburg and many others.

He is an award   panel in the various international piano competitions.

References

External links

1962 births
Living people
Kazakhstani pianists
Artistic directors (music)
Honored Artists of the Russian Federation
21st-century pianists